Fluorescence is the fourth and final studio album by American shoegaze band Asobi Seksu. It was released on February 14, 2011 by Polyvinyl Record Co.

The artwork for Fluorescence was designed by Vaughan Oliver, noted for his album covers for the 4AD label.

Two singles were released from the album: "Trails" on January 17, 2011, and "Perfectly Crystal" on May 9, 2011.

Track listing

Notes
 On the Japanese edition of the album, the Japanese version of "Perfectly Crystal" appears as track four, while the original English version appears as track 14.

Credits
Credits are adapted from the album's liner notes.

Asobi Seksu
 Yuki Chikudate – vocals, synthesizer, organ
 Larry Gorman – drums, percussion, additional vocals on "Trails"
 James Hanna – guitar, synthesizer, vocals
 Billy Pavone – bass

Additional musicians
 Paul Dateh – violin
 Kevin Farrell – double bass
 Devin Maxwell – percussion
 Chris Zane – percussion

Production
 Greg Calbi – mastering
 Tamon Imai – engineering (assistant)
 Chris Zane – production, mixing, recording

Design
 Marc Atkins – photography
 Christaan Felber – photography (band portraits)
 Vaughan Oliver – art direction, design

Charts

References

External links
 
 

2011 albums
Asobi Seksu albums
Polyvinyl Record Co. albums